Matthew Ryan Wolfe (born 12 June 2000) is an English professional footballer who plays as a midfielder for Barnsley.

Career
Wolfe joined Barnsley at the age of 10. On 19 July 2020, he made his professional league debut as a substitute in a 1-0 victory over Nottingham Forest. On 15 October 2020, Wolfe joined National League side Notts County on a three-month loan deal. On 5 January 2021, the loan was then extended until the end of the season.

On 12 July 2021, Wolfe and three other Barnsley teammates, was loaned out to Danish 1st Division club Esbjerg fB for the rest of 2021.

Career statistics

References

External links

2000 births
Living people
English footballers
English expatriate footballers
Association football midfielders
English Football League players
Danish 1st Division players
National League (English football) players
Barnsley F.C. players
Notts County F.C. players
Esbjerg fB players
English expatriate sportspeople in Denmark
Expatriate men's footballers in Denmark